Paveletsky (masculine), Paveletskoye (neuter), or Paveletskaya (feminine) may refer to:

Paveletsky railway station in Moscow, Russia
Paveletskaya (Koltsevaya Line), a station of the Moscow Metro
Paveletskaya (Zamoskvoretskaya Line), a station of the Moscow Metro